Rareeram is a 1986 Indian Malayalam film, directed by  Sibi Malayil and produced by Appachan. The film stars Mammootty, Shobhana, Nedumudi Venu and Geetha in the lead roles. The film has musical score by Kodakara Madhavan.

Cast

Mammootty as Nandakumar
Shobhana as Meera
Nedumudi Venu as Venu
Geetha as Radha
Geethu Mohandas as Geethu
Rohini as Chitra
Thilakan as Dr. Tharakan
Innocent as Lonappan
Sukumari as Soudamini
Unnimary as Padmavathi
Aranmula Ponnamma
Mamukkoya as Koya
Mala Aravindan as Aravindakshan Nair
T. P. Madhavan as Man At the Bank
Philomina as Sister
Alex Mathew as bank employee

Soundtrack
The music was composed by Kodakara Madhavan and the lyrics were written by O. N. V. Kurup.

References

External links
 

1986 films
1980s Malayalam-language films